The 1956 United States presidential election in Arkansas took place on November 6, 1956, as part of the 1956 United States presidential election. State voters chose eight representatives, or electors, to the Electoral College, who voted for president and vice president.

Arkansas was won by Adlai Stevenson (D–Illinois), running with Senator Estes Kefauver, with 52.46% of the popular vote against incumbent President Dwight D. Eisenhower (R–Pennsylvania), running with Vice President Richard Nixon, with 45.82% of the popular vote.

As of the 2020 presidential election, this is the last election in which the Democratic nominee carried Arkansas without winning the presidency.

Results

Results by county

See also
 United States presidential elections in Arkansas

Notes

References

Arkansas
1956
1956 Arkansas elections